An Austrian Perspective on the History of Economic Thought is two-volume non-fiction work written by Murray N. Rothbard. Rothbard said he originally intended to write a "standard Adam Smith-to-the-present moderately sized book"; but expanded the scope of the project to include economists who preceded Smith and to comprise a multi-volume series. Rothbard completed only the first two volumes, Economic Thought Before Adam Smith and Classical Economics.

Release history
 An Austrian Perspective on the History of Economic Thought. Ludwig von Mises Institute. Auburn, Alabama. 2006.  (2 Volume Hardback totaling 1,084 pages). 
 An Austrian Perspective on the History of Economic Thought. Edward Elgar Publishing. 1995. .

References

Further reading
 Murray Rothbard on "Why I Wrote My Histories of Thought"
 A favorable review of An Austrian Perspective

External links
 "It All Began, As Usual, With The Greeks" (Volume One, Chapter 1 )
 "The Celebrated Adam Smith" (Chapter 16)
 PDF and ePub downloads of the book from Mises.org
 Volume 3: audio file and Transcript (from Stephan Kinsella)

1995 non-fiction books
2006 non-fiction books
Books about the history of economic thought
Austrian School publications
Books by Murray Rothbard
Unfinished books
Books about capitalism